The late Middle Jurassic lagerstätte at La Voulte-sur-Rhône, in the Ardèche region of southwestern France, offers paleontologists an outstanding view of an undisturbed paleoecosystem that was preserved in fine detail as organisms died at the site and settled to the bottom of a shallow epicontinental sea, with a folded floor that in places exceeded 200 m at this site. The site preserves a marine system of the Lower Callovian stage, a little over 160 mya. The sequence is exposed in a series of quarries at La Boissine, west of the village of La Voulte-sur-Rhône. Iron pyrites in the silty shale are symptoms of an anoxic environment. The site was recognized among French paleontologists from the mid-nineteenth century for its finely detailed fossils.

Preservation

Some soft parts of organisms are preserved as phosphatised concretions, in exceptional cases down to cellular details, e.g. retinal structures in the eyes of conchyliocarid crustacea.  Apart
from Beecher's Trilobite Bed and the Hunsrück Slate, La Voulte-sur-Rhône is the only other locality where extensive pyritization of soft parts occurs.
However, pyritisation is not the only preservation pathway; several stages of mineralization (originally phosphate followed by calcite or gypsum, then pyrite and finally galena) are seen, each successive mineralization event degrades the detail preserved, with only gross morphological features preserved in the most advanced stages.

Fauna and flora
The fauna preserved can be broadly divided into the allochthonous fauna (consisting of soft-bodied organisms which lived on the sea floor (benthic) or swam freely just above it (nektobenthic)) and the in-situ mortality horizon.

The allochthonous fauna contains rare and well-preserved organisms. Fossils of pycnogonids ("sea-spiders"), the first find in Mesozoic strata in an admittedly very patchy fossil record, were identified in 2007.
A coleoid cephalopod (a single specimen of a small octopus) was described from La Voulte-sur-Rhône in 1982. The marine crocodile Metriorhynchus, fish, decapod, mysidcrustaceans, thylacocephalans, crinoids, and ophiuroids (most commonly Ophiopinna elegans) are also to be found.

The in situ mortality horizon consists of abundant pavements of the bivalve Bositra buchi and trace fossils of suspected worm burrows.

Two specimens of plants suggest that a shoreline was not far distant, represented today by France's Massif Central.

References 

Jurassic System of Europe
Callovian Stage
Lagerstätten
Paleontology in France